The British Columbia Moderate Democratic Movement was a minor political party in the Province of British Columbia, Canada.
In 2004, it joined with the British Columbia Democratic Alliance, the Citizens Action Party and Link BC to form the British Columbia Democratic Coalition.
This coalition merged with the Reform Party of British Columbia and All Nations Party of British Columbia on January 15, 2005 to form a new, centrist political party, the Democratic Reform British Columbia.
Despite this, the BCMDM nominated two candidates in the 2005 BC election: James Solhiem won 123 votes (0.61% of the total) in the riding of Chilliwack-Sumas, and David Michael Anderson won 235 votes (1.20% of the total) in Chilliwack-Kent.

The party was de-registered by Elections BC in July 2008.

Platform

The platform proposes:

Education
forgivable student loans to cover tuition]fees for B.C. residents
increased funding for school boards
greater autonomy for school boards to create new programs, subject to provincial standards
Healthcare
paying practitioners for "promotion of wellness rather than the treatment of disease"
creating regional treatment centres covering all stages of care from diagnosis to treatment
Economics
a B.C. business development bank to assist the creation of new businesses
an "Idea Development Centre" to help entrepreneurs develop business plans and gain funding
Governance
opposing the privatization of public assets, and returning already-privatized assets to public ownership
requiring all Members of the Legislative Assembly to attend monthly town hall meetings in their communities
increased transparency, including access to information measures making all government, Crown corporation and public-private partnership records open to public inspection
laws to hold public officials accountable for what the party called "fiscal mismanagement and misleading budgets"
Justice
to "ensure violent offenders are removed from our streets"
increased use of restorative justice, halfway houses, and intense supervision for first-time non-violent offenders
Forestry
ensuring raw logs are processed in the community in which they were produced
funding forest management to prevent and control wildfires
ending the "self-policing" of forestry companies
Environment
maintaining the ban on bulk water exports
funding scientific research as the basis for all environmental decisions
increasing penalties for environmental violations, and putting funds raised directly into park maintenance and habitat protection
investing in pollution control research
BC Hydro
"fairly priced electricity" through investment in new generating facilities for BC Hydro, to replace aging facilities nearing the end of their life

See also
List of British Columbia political parties

References

External links
Moderate Democratic Movement site

Moderate Democratic Movement
Moderate Democratic Movement
Political parties disestablished in 2008